The Bavarian Pt 2/4 N was a steam locomotive with the Royal Bavarian State Railways (Königlich Bayerische Staatsbahn). It was developed in parallel with the Bavarian Pt 2/3 and for the same duties. Instead of a fixed carrying axle it was given a bogie. This change brought no advantage, so the more cost-effective Pt 2/3 was favoured. The two Pt 2/4 N engines were nevertheless taken over by the Reichsbahn, but were retired by 1928.

See also 
 Royal Bavarian State Railways
 List of Bavarian locomotives and railbuses

References

4-4-0T locomotives
Pt 2 4 N
Standard gauge locomotives of Germany
Railway locomotives introduced in 1909
2′B n2t locomotives